Nova Scotia Route 253 is a collector road in the Canadian province of Nova Scotia.

It is located in the Halifax Regional Municipality and connects Armdale with Herring Cove. The route generally parallels the eastern coast of the Chebucto Peninsula.

Between the junction with Route 349 in Armdale and Fortress Drive in Ferguson's Cove, it is known as Purcell's Cove Road. Afterwards and until Village Road in Herring Cove, it is known as John Brackett Drive. The last stretch in Herring Cove is known as Hebridean Drive.

Communities

Armdale
Jollimore
Boulderwood
Purcell's Cove
Ferguson's Cove
Herring Cove

List of parks

Provincial
 Herring Cove Provincial Park Reserve

Federal
 York Redoubt National Historic Site

Municipal
 Sir Sandford Fleming Park
 Chocolate Lake Park

Yacht clubs
Royal Nova Scotian Yacht Squadron
Armdale Yacht Club

See also
List of Nova Scotia provincial highways

References

Nova Scotia provincial highways
Roads in Halifax, Nova Scotia